Kadappakada or Kadappakkada is a neighbourhood and important junction in the city of Kollam, in the state of Kerala, India. NH 744 (Earlier NH 208), that connects Kollam with Tirumangalam meets the Asramam Link Road at Kadappakada junction. Most of the times the authorities are diverting the traffic in National Highways through the Link road, if required.

Proposals for facilities improvement 

 As it is a major part of the city, the National Transportation Planning and Research Centre (NATPAC) has conducted a feasibility study on constructing a flyover or underpass at the Kadappakada junction in 2012. 
 The Government of Kerala conducted an investment conference, Partner Kerala in Kochi in February 2014 where the Kollam Development Authority (KDA) submitted a proposal for Kadappakada junction improvement.

Public/Private institutions near Kadappakada 
 SBT Zonal Office
 Hotel Sea Pearl
 Nandilath G-mart, Kollam
 Muthoot Mini Theatres DHANYA & REMYA
 Sankar's Institute of Medical Science(SIMS)
 Malayala Manorama 
 Sports Club
 Janayugom Press
 The Central Park Hotel
 Nair's Hospital

Gallery

See also 

 Kollam
 Kollam Junction railway station
 Kollam KSRTC Bus Station
 Kollam district
 Kollam Port
 Kollam Beach
 Kollam Pooram
 Chinnakada
 Asramam Maidan

References 

Neighbourhoods in Kollam